Baldur Þórhallsson is Professor of Political Science and Jean Monnet Chair in European Studies at the Faculty of Political Science at the University of Iceland.

Education 

Þórhallsson holds a PhD (1999) and MA (1994) in Political Science from the University of Essex in England.

In 2002, he established a Centre for Small State Studies at the University of Iceland in association with colleagues around the globe and re-established the Icelandic Institute of International Affairs. He was Chair of the Board of the institute and is currently a member of the Board.

Research 

Þórhallsson's research areas are primarily small state studies, European integration, Icelandic politics and Iceland's foreign policy. He is most prominent for his research on small states and Iceland's European integration. He edited and contributed several chapters to the first Icelandic textbook on European integration. He has authored or edited three books:

Arnórsson, Auðunn, Baldur Thorhallsson, Pia Hansson and Tómas Joensen, (eds.) 2015. Saga Evrópusamruns: Evrópusambandið og þátttaka Íslands (History of European integration: The European Union and Iceland’s engagement in the European project). Reykjavík: Háskólaútgáfan (University of Iceland Press).
Baldur Thorhallsson (ed.). Iceland and European Integration On the Edge. London: Routledge, 2004.
Baldur Thorhallsson. The Role of Small States in the European Union. Aldershot: Ashgate, 2000. 
His most highly cited research includes the aforementioned 2000 monograph and several journal articles on the challenges and opportunities that small states face in world politics.

References

External links
 Official university website 

Year of birth missing (living people)
Living people
Baldur Þórhallsson
Alumni of the University of Essex
Baldur Þórhallsson